Sylvia Boye is a Ghanaian woman, former Chief Executive and first female Registrar of the West African Examination Council.

Education
Boye attended Wesley Girls' Senior High School in Cape Coast. Boye earned a Bachelor of Arts and LLD from the University of Ghana.

References

Living people
Ghanaian businesspeople
People educated at Wesley Girls' Senior High School
Year of birth missing (living people)